Vouni tou Lazarou [Greek: Βουνί τού Λάζαρου] is a locality in Tsada, situated at 561 metres above sea level. Vouni tou Lazarou, Paphos District is a locality and is southwest of Tsáda and northeast of Aetovounos. Asprovounos is located only 1.8 km away.

Climate

References

Communities in Paphos District
Paphos